German Braille is one of the older braille alphabets. The French-based order of the letter assignments was largely settled on with the 1878 convention that decided the standard for international braille. However, the assignments for German letters beyond the 26 of the basic Latin alphabet are mostly unrelated to French values.

Letters

In numerical order by decade, the letters are:

The generic accent sign, is used with foreign names such as  Molière that have accented letters not found in German.  There are numerous contractions and abbreviations.

Punctuation

Punctuation is as follows:

Only the first asterisk is marked with dot 6, so print *** is in braille .

 is the Artikel sign, marking an article of a document.

For the brackets of phonetic transcription, German Braille uses a modified form, ....

Additional punctuation and symbols, especially mathematical, are explained in the external reference below.

Numbers

Numbers are introduced with the sign . They are dropped to decade 5 for ordinals and for the denominator of fractions.

The percent sign requires the number sign even after a number:   ; otherwise it would look like the (undefined) fraction .

In a compound fraction, a repeat of the number sign separate the units from the fraction:   .

Formatting

The emphasis sign (for italics, underline, or bold) is marked with an extra point, when it occurs in the middle of a word.  It is doubled, when more than one word is emphasized, in which case the ending sign  will be required at the end of the last word.

The all-caps sign is used for initialisms and the like.  Doubled, it is used for all-cap text, such as titles, and the same ending sign, is used.  Names with initials, such as J.S. Bach, do not require the cap sign. The lower-case sign  is used to mark mixed case or exceptions to expected capitalization; as such, it replaces the apostrophe that sets off the plural -s in print:

(Note the initialism sign can be used for a single letter.)

Lower-case metric units are marked as lower-case:   .  This is useful, as it ends the scope of the number sign :

 ,  .

See also

 Moon type is a simplification of the Latin alphabet for embossing. An adaptation for German-reading blind people has been proposed.

Notes

References

Sources

Das System der deutschen Blindenschrift, 2005

French-ordered braille alphabets
German language